Gabrielsen is a surname. Notable people with the surname include:

Alexander Gabrielsen (born 1985), footballer
Ansgar Gabrielsen (born 1955), Norwegian consultant and former politician for the Conservative Party
Elias Gabrielsen (1888–1973), Norwegian trade unionist, newspaper editor and politician for the Labour and Communist parties
Gabriel Gabrielsen Holtsmark (1867–1954), Norwegian educator, physicist and actuary
Gøhril Gabrielsen (born 1961), Norwegian writer
Hans Gabrielsen (1891–1965), Norwegian jurist and politician for the Liberal Party
Hans-Christian Gabrielsen (born 1967), Norwegian industrial worker, politician and trade unionist
Jørgen Gabrielsen (born 1935), Danish former sports shooter
Odd Stokke Gabrielsen (born 1951), Norwegian biochemist
Ole Gabriel Gabrielsen Ueland (1799–1870), Norwegian political leader and member of the Norwegian Parliament (1833–1869)
Romund Gabrielsen (1917–1971), British swimmer
Ruben Gabrielsen (born 1992), Norwegian football defender
Valter Gabrielsen (1921–1999), Norwegian politician for the Norwegian Labour Party

See also
Bache-Gabrielsen, brand of cognac that is over 110 years old
Broder Gabrielsen, a 1966 Norwegian drama film
Gabrielsen Natatorium, swimming and diving facility at the University of Georgia (UGA) in Athens, Georgia, U.S.A.
Gabriel
Gabrielsson

Danish-language surnames
Norwegian-language surnames